Huckleberry Finn is a fictional character created by Mark Twain.

Huckleberry Finn may also refer to:
Adventures of Huckleberry Finn, a Mark Twain novel
Huckleberry Finn (1920 film), a silent film featuring Gordon Griffith
Huckleberry Finn (1931 film), starring Jackie Coogan and Junior Durkin
Huckleberry Finn (1974 film), a musical starring Jeff East
Huckleberry Finn (1975 film), a TV movie with Ron Howard
Huckleberry Finn, an opera by Hall Overton
Huckleberry Finn (EP), by Duke Special

See also 
 Adventures of Huckleberry Finn (disambiguation)
Huckleberry Finn and His Friends (1979 TV series), starring Ian Tracey
Huckleberry no Bouken, a 1994 Japanese anime